Cnemidophorus gaigei, commonly known as Gaige's rainbow lizard, is a species of teiid lizard endemic to Colombia.

References

gaigei
Reptiles described in 1915
Taxa named by Alexander Grant Ruthven
Reptiles of Colombia